Barsa  is a village in Koura District of Lebanon.  
It has a  Maronite  and Greek Orthodox population. It has one of the most Cryptocurrency miners in Koura District.

References

Twinned towns
Barsa is twinned with

 Thebes, Greece

 Alert, Canada

 Tripoli, Greece

External links
 Barsa, Localiban

Populated places in the North Governorate
Koura District
Maronite Christian communities in Lebanon
Eastern Orthodox Christian communities in Lebanon